Alipiri Padala Mandapam or Alipiri is the place at foot of seven hills in Tirupati, the pilgrim city of Sri Venkateswara Swami, in the state of Andhra Pradesh, India.  

Alipiri is one of two ways to reach Tirumala on foot, and it was until recently the only one in modern times. Srivari Mettu, about 20 km away, is the original one that was renovated and brought back to use in 2008. Alipiri is the longer route with 3550 steps, Srivari Mettu is shorter with 2388 steps. 

Alipiri is also the foot of two road ways, one up and one down leading to Tirumala through the Seven Hills. It is therefore called "The Gate Way to Tirumala Venkateswara Temple"

A long time ago, pilgrims used to climb all Seven Hills through the stepped way on foot because there were no other options. Pilgrims would visit from far away, cook and eat there and rest for some time. After resting, they would start to climb the steps.

Now the entire stepped way is covered with a roof to protect pilgrims from sunlight and rain. Lights are also provided. Special privilege is provided to the pilgrims who came on foot to visit the Lord.

Etymology
Alipiri literally means "resting place"

Temples

Srivari Padala Mandapam
Srivari Padala Mandapam is a temple dedicated to Lord Venkateswara at Alipiri. The presiding deity is referred to Padala Venkateswara Swamy. As per legend, Lord Venkateswara, after Ekantha Seva at Tirumala, would come visit his consort Padamavati at Tiruchanur, down the hill through Alipiri Steps path and would leave his footwear at this place and hence the name "Padala Mandapam"(Telugu : Padalu refers to Foot). Devotees going on Tirumala Yatra from Tirupati offer prayers here first by carrying "Srivari Padukalu"(believed to be a representation of the footwear worn by Lord Venkateswara himself) on their heads. The temple comes under Sri GovindarajaSwamy Temple circle and is being administered by Tirumala Tirupati  Devasthanams.

Sri Lakshmi Narayana Swamy Temple
There is a sub-temple dedicated to Lord Lakshmi Narayana in the Alipiri Padala Mandapam Temple complex which lies east of Padala Mandapam. The temple entrance and the deity faces towards the west. It has a sub-shrine dedicated to Andal.

Sri Vinayaka Swamy Temple
There is also a temple dedicated to Lord Ganesha in the Alipiri Padala Mandapam Temple complex which lies on the 2nd Ghat Road leading from Tirupati to Tirumala. Devotees going by Road will offer prayers at this temple before starting Tirumala Yatra.

Footsteps

There is an ancient footsteps path to Tirumala, that starts from Alipiri known as Alipiri Metlu. The Devotees to fulfil their Vow to Lord Venkateswara will take this path to reach Tirumala on foot from Tirupati. It consists of a total 3550 Steps which makes a distance of 12 km. There are four Gopurams(Temple Towers) on the way. It is completely roofed and passes through seven hills which are part of Seshachalam Hills.

Festivals
All vaishnavite festivals will be celebrated at Padalamandapam Temple which includes Vaikuntha Ekadasi, Rathasapthami.

Metlotsavam
Metlotsavam is the festival which will be held once in three months, to the Alipiri footsteps leading to Tirumala. It is organised by Dasa sahitya project under Tirumala Tirupati Devasthanams. The festival includes group of devotees taking a trek to Tirumala singing spiritual songs.

Sapthagiri Security Zone
At Alipiri, a security zone was established, in 2009, to screen vehicles and pilgrims entering Tirumala, to safeguard the hills from terrorists and anti-social elements.

Reference lists 

 
Buildings and structures in Tirupati
Tirumala Tirupati Devasthanams